The 2010 Kyalami Superbike World Championship round was the sixth round of the 2010 Superbike World Championship season. It took place on the weekend of 14–16 May 2010 at Kyalami, South Africa.

Results

Superbike race 1 classification

Superbike race 2 classification

Supersport race classification

External links
 The official website of the Superbike World Championship

Kyalami Round